Poa macrantha is a species of grass known by the common names seashore bluegrass and large-flowered sand dune bluegrass. It is native to the west coast of North America from Alaska to northern California, where it grows in sand dunes and other beach habitat.

Description
Poa macrantha is a perennial grass growing in loose clumps with stems up to 60 centimeters in maximum height. The grass grows from a network of very long, stout rhizomes and stolons which may be up to 4 meters in length, anchoring the grass in its shifting sandy substrate. The inflorescence is a dense series of clustered spikelets which are flattened and longer than wide. The plant is dioecious with male and female individuals bearing different types of flowers; the two flower types are similar in appearance.

External links
Jepson Manual Treatment - Poa macrantha
USDA Plants Profile; Poa macrantha
Grass Manual Treatment

macrantha
Native grasses of California
Grasses of the United States
Grasses of Canada
Dioecious plants